Merosargus par is a species of soldier fly in the family Stratiomyidae.

Distribution
Mexico], El Salvador, Panama, Belize.

References

Stratiomyidae
Insects described in 1932
Diptera of North America
Taxa named by Charles Howard Curran
Fauna of Panama